Feng Hetu (封和突 Fēng Hétū, 438-501 CE) was a Chinese military official and a minister of the Northern Wei dynasty. He probably was of Xianbei ethnicity.

His tomb was discovered partially destroyed in Xiaozhan village, west of Datong. It contained three silver vessels of foreign origin. One plate especially has Sasanian-style designs, and is thought to have been manufactured in Northern Afghanistan or Southern Turkmenistan. It is nearly identical in composition to another plate which has been found in Kabul. The plate is dated the 3rd-4th century CE, and probably belongs to the artistic production of the Kushano-Sasanians.

The tomb also had an epitaph, giving a summary account of the life of Feng Hetu. He died in Chang'an in 501, and was re-buried in his native Datong in Xiaozhan village (小站村) in 504. The epitaph reads:

Northern Wei art came under influence of Indian and Central Asian traditions through the mean of trade routes. Most importantly for Chinese art history, the Wei rulers converted to Buddhism and became great patrons of Buddhist arts.

See also
 Central Asian objects of Northern Wei tombs

References

Buildings and structures completed in the 6th century
1981 archaeological discoveries
Archaeological discoveries in China
Northern Wei
Tombs in China